La mesera is a Mexican telenovela produced by Televisa for Telesistema Mexicano in 1963.

Cast 
María Elena Marqués
Raúl Ramírez
Raúl Meraz
Jesús Valero
Ada Carrasco
Virginia Manzano
Teresa Glabois
Dalia Iñiguez
Araceli Chavira
Óscar Morelli

References

External links 

Mexican telenovelas
1963 telenovelas
Televisa telenovelas
1963 Mexican television series debuts
1963 Mexican television series endings
Spanish-language telenovelas